Sergey Sheyko (born 9 January 1973) is a Belarusian figure skater. He competed in the pairs event at the 1994 Winter Olympics.

References

1973 births
Living people
Belarusian male pair skaters
Olympic figure skaters of Belarus
Figure skaters at the 1994 Winter Olympics
Figure skaters from Minsk